The 2018–19 Southern Combination Football League season was the 94th in the history of the competition, which lies at levels 9 and 10 of the English football league system.

The provisional club allocations for steps 5 and 6 were announced by the FA on 25 May.

Premier Division

The Premier Division consisted of 20 clubs, the same as last season, after Worthing United and Littlehampton Town were relegated to Division One, and Haywards Heath Town and Three Bridges were promoted to Isthmian League Division One South.

Four clubs joined the division:
 Langney Wanderers – promoted from Division One
 Lingfield – promoted from Division One
 Little Common – promoted from Division One
 Shoreham – relegated from Isthmian League Division One South

League table

Results table

Results by matchday

Top scorers

Stadia and locations

Division One

Division One remained at 18 clubs after Little Common, Langney Wanderers and Lingfield were promoted to the Premier Division, and Ringmer left the league. Four new clubs joined:

 Alfold – promoted from Division Two
 Littlehampton Town – relegated from the Premier Division
 Sidlesham – promoted from Division Two
 Worthing United – relegated from the Premier Division

League table

Results table

Results by matchday

Top scorers

Stadia and locations

Division Two

Division Two featured three new clubs after Alfold and Sidlesham were promoted to Division One, and Lancing United resigned from the league:
Angmering Seniors – joined from the West Sussex League
Brighton Electricity – joined from the Brighton, Worthing & District League
Copthorne – joined from the Mid-Sussex League

Also, Clymping F.C. changed their name to Littlehampton United

Promotion from this division depends on ground grading as well as league position.

League table

Results table

Results by matchday

Top scorers

Stadia and locations

Peter Bentley League Challenge Cup
Source SCFL Fixtures and Results

First round

Second round

Notes

Third round

Quarter-finals

Semi-finals

Final

Division One Challenge Cup
Source SCFL Fixtures and Results

First round

Second round

Third round

Notes

Semi-finals

Final

References

2018-19
9